Daniel Antonius Nikola Koerhuis (born 26 July 1981 in Dedemsvaart) is a Dutch politician, serving as a Member of Parliament for the People's Party for Freedom and Democracy (VVD, Volkspartij voor Vrijheid en Democratie) since 23 March 2017.

References

1981 births
Living people
21st-century Dutch politicians
Members of the House of Representatives (Netherlands)
People from Avereest
People's Party for Freedom and Democracy politicians
20th-century Dutch people